Year 1398 (MCCCXCVIII) was a common year starting on Tuesday (link will display the full calendar) of the Julian calendar.

Events 
 January–December 
 March 15 – Trần Thuận Tông is forced to abdicate as ruler of the Trần dynasty in modern-day Vietnam, in favour of his three-year-old son Trần Thiếu Đế.
 April - May – The Bosnian nobility dethrone Queen Helen and replace her with Stephen Ostoja.
 June 25 – Jianwen succeeds his grandfather, Hongwu, as Emperor of Ming dynasty China.
 July – The Stecknitz Canal is completed between the rivers Elbe and Trave (at Lübeck) in modern-day north Germany, one of the earliest navigable summit level canals in the world.
 September 
King Richard II of England exiles his cousin Henry Bolingbroke (the future Henry IV of England) for 10 years, in order to end Henry's feud with Thomas de Mowbray, 1st Duke of Norfolk, who is also exiled.
As France withdraws its support for Antipope Benedict XIII, an army led by Geoffrey Boucicaut occupies Avignon, and starts a five-year siege of the papal palace.
 October 12 – The Treaty of Salynas is signed by Vytautas, Grand Duke of Lithuania, and Konrad von Jungingen, Grand Master of the Teutonic Knights, in an attempt to cede Samogitia to the Knights.
 October 14 – King Taejo of Joseon abdicates the throne of the Joseon dynasty in modern-day Korea, following the murder of his heir Yi Bangsuk, during a coup by Yi's older half-brother, Yi Bang-won, in The First Strife Of Princes. Taejo's eldest son Jeongjong succeeds to the throne.
 November 11 – Janus succeeds his father, James I, as King of Cyprus and claimant to the throne of Armenian Cilicia.
 December 17 – Timur defeats the last ruler of the Delhi Sultanate, which has been weakened after four years of civil war. Following his victory, Timur's Islamic troops sack the city of Delhi, and proceed to massacre hundreds of thousands of the state's Hindu inhabitants.

 Date unknown 
 The Teutonic Knights recommence their raids of Lithuania.
 The Teutonic Knights conquer the island of Gotland, near Sweden, which has previously been run by the piratical Victual Brothers.
 Martin of Aragon launches a crusade against the Moors in North Africa.
 The Kingdom of Singapura falls, after being invaded by the Majapahit Empire.
 Abdullah succeeds Abu Amir as ruler of the Marinid dynasty in modern-day Morocco.
 Bunei succeeds his father, Satto, as King of Chūzan (modern-day central Okinawa, Japan).
 Glendalough monastery in Wicklow, Ireland is destroyed by English troops.
 Ferapontov Monastery is founded in modern-day northwest Russia by Therapont of Belozersk.
 The Munmyo Confucian shrine and Sungkyunkwan University are founded in modern-day Seoul.
 Mount Grace Priory is established in Yorkshire, England.
 According to fringe theorists, the Scottish explorer Henry I Sinclair, Earl of Orkney, reaches North America.

Births 

 August 19 – Íñigo López de Mendoza, 1st Marquis of Santillana, Spanish poet (d. 1458)
 date unknown
 Cecília Rozgonyi, Hungarian noble and heroine (d. 1434)
 Spytek of Melsztyn, Polish nobleman (d. 1439)
 Moctezuma I, second Aztec emperor (d. 1469)
 William Waynflete, English Lord Chancellor and bishop of Winchester (d. 1486)
 Johannes Gutenberg, German inventor of the printing press
 Tlacaélel, Aztec warrior, thinker, high priest and noble for the Mexica Empire (d. 1487)

Deaths 
 January 6 – Rupert II, Elector Palatine (b. 1325)
 January 31 – Former Emperor Sukō of Japan (b. 1334)
 June 24 – Hongwu Emperor of China (b. 1328)
 July 20 – Roger Mortimer, 4th Earl of March, heir to the throne of England (b. 1374)
 July/August (uncertain) – Kadi Burhan al-Din, poet, kadi, and ruler of Sivas (b. 1345) 
 September 9 – James I of Cyprus (b. 1334)
 October 5 – Blanche of Navarre, Queen of France (b. 1333)
 date unknown – Jeong Dojeon, Korean philosopher

References